The Maharajas' Express is a luxury tourist train owned and operated by Indian Railway Catering and Tourism Corporation (IRCTC). It serves four routes across North-West and Central India, mainly centered on Rajasthan between the months of October and April.

The Maharajas' Express was voted "The World's Leading Luxury Train" Seven times in a row at The World Travel Awards from 2012 through 2018. Maharajas' Express also received recognition from the Conde Nast Travelers Reader Choice Travel Award.

History
The luxury train service was started in March 2010. The IRCTC and Cox and Kings India Ltd. entered a joint venture, setting up Royale Indian Rail Tours Ltd. (RIRTL) to oversee the functioning and management of the Maharajas' Express. This arrangement was terminated on 12 August 2011, and the train was then operated exclusively by IRCTC.

Carriages
The train comprises 23 carriages which include accommodation, dining, bar, lounge, generator, and store cars. Accommodation is available in 14 guest carriages with a total passenger capacity of 84. The train also has a lounge called the Rajah Club with a private bar, two dining cars, and a dedicated bar car. The train is also equipped with a water filtration plant. An on-board souvenir boutique offers that for passengers.

Guest cabins 
23 carriages with 14 individual cabins provide seating and sleeping capacity for 84 guests. There are 20 Deluxe Cabins, 18 Junior Suites, 4 Suites, and a Presidential Suite. All suites have a full bath. The guest cabins are comparable to ones on cruise ships.

There are five carriages in the category of Deluxe Cabins, a total of 20 cabins accommodating 40 passengers. There are a total of 18 cabins in the category of Junior Suites, accommodating 36 passengers. Additionally, there are also four Suites. A Presidential suite occupies an entire rail carriage, incorporating a separate sitting-cum-dining room, a master bedroom and bathroom with shower and bathtub, a twin bedroom and bathroom with shower, similar to the private railroad cars that were used in the United States.

Dining and bar coaches 
The train has two dining cars—named Rang Mahal and Mayur Mahal—designed for full fine dining service, served by a state-of-the-art kitchen car. Mayur Mahal (the Peacock restaurant) has a peacock feather theme in its décor. The Rajah Club is a dedicated bar carriage. The Safari lounge and bar have a multilingual library.

Routes 

Maharajas Express operates Four Different Itineraries now every month from October to April, of which two are short-term Golden Triangle (Delhi, Jaipur, and Agra) tours and the other three are week-long pan-Indian voyages:

In popular media
ITV correspondent Sir Trevor McDonald travels India by the Maharajas' Express in a 2019 documentary.
Featured in Episode 3 of Season 2 of the Discovery Channel Canada series Mighty Trains.

Gallery

See also 

Fairy Queen
Palace on Wheels
Royal Orient
Deccan Odyssey
Mahaparinirvan Express
Golden Chariot
Royal Rajasthan on Wheels

References

External links 

 

Luxury trains in India
Transport in Udaipur
Rail transport in Rajasthan
2010 establishments in India